Brachyceridae is a family of weevils. There are at least 150 genera in Brachyceridae. It was treated as a subfamily of Curculionidae.

Cladogram

See also
 List of Brachyceridae genera

References

 Bisby F.A., Roskov Y.R., Orrell T.M., Nicolson D., Paglinawan L.E., Bailly N., Kirk P.M., Bourgoin T., Baillargeon G., Ouvrard D. (red.) (2011)  Catalogue of Life
 Biolib

 
Beetle families